Lamjung Durbar is a former palace in Lamjung District, Gandaki Province.

It was built in the 16th century by Ghale Gurung Rajas. Lamjung Durbar also acts as a fortification.

Lamjung Durbar was nationalised on 23 August 2007. In 2015, the Government of Nepal issued stamps featuring the Lamjung Durbar.

References

Further reading 

 
 

16th-century establishments in Nepal
Forts in Nepal
Buildings and structures in Lamjung District